Vivianus is a masculine given name which may refer to:

 Vivianus (jurist), second century Roman jurist
 Flavius Antoninus Messala Vivianus, a Roman politician and consul in 463
 Saint Vivianus (died c. 490), French saint and first known bishop of Saintes

Masculine given names